The House at 391 Williams Street in Stoneham, Massachusetts, is one of the town's more elaborate early Greek Revival cottage.  Built c. 1820, it is a -story five-bay wood-frame structure, with a single story rear ell.  Its most prominent features are the front gable dormers, which appear to be original to the period, and its full-width front porch, which is probably an early 20th-century addition.  Its windows have molded surrounds, and the main entrance is flanked by sidelight windows.

The house was listed on the National Register of Historic Places in 1984.

See also
National Register of Historic Places listings in Stoneham, Massachusetts
National Register of Historic Places listings in Middlesex County, Massachusetts

References

Houses on the National Register of Historic Places in Stoneham, Massachusetts
Houses completed in 1820
Houses in Stoneham, Massachusetts